Richard Bentley (1662–1742) was an English theologian, classical scholar and critic.

Richard Bentley may also refer to:

 Richard Bentley (writer) (1708–1782), son of the classical scholar; playwright and engraver, associate of Thomas Gray and Horace Walpole
 Richard Bentley (publisher) (1794–1871), British publisher
 Richard Bentley (athlete) (born 1960), Guamanian Olympic hurdler
 Richard Irvine Bentley (1854–1909), British surgeon, superintendent and medical officer
 Richard Bentley (MP), in 1420, Member of Parliament (MP) for Shrewsbury

See also
 Dick Bentley (1907–1995), Australian comedian and actor